Zaklanec is a village east of Horjul in the Inner Carniola region of Slovenia.

History
The houses in the village are relatively new buildings because the entire village burnt down in a fire in 1920 and was also bombed by the Germans during the Second World War after the capitulation of Italy in 1943. On November 20, 1942, the Partisans abducted and killed seven people from Zaklanec in the Broad Creek Gorge in nearby Dobrova.

References

External links
Zaklanec on Geopedia

Populated places in the Municipality of Horjul